The Aborigines in Roman mythology are the oldest inhabitants of central Italy, connected in legendary history with Aeneas, Latinus and Evander. They were supposed to have descended from their mountain home near Reate (an ancient Sabine town) upon Latium, where they expelled the Sicels and subsequently settled down as Latini under a King Latinus.

Etymology
Lycophron calls a people of central Italy, .

Background
The Aborigines were possibly descendants of the Pelasgians, the original inhabitants of Greece and surrounding regions, or, more precisely, descendents of the Oenotrians, a tribe descended from Pelasgus by Oenotrus, son of Lycaon, primeval king of Arcadia. Their earliest known home was Reate, an ancient Sabine town to the north-east of Latium near Carseoli. These Aborigines were driven from their mountain home by the Sabines and settled on the river Anio. The Sicels, who inhabited Latium at the time, gave way to the Aborigines, and a portion of them emigrated to Sicily, providing the origin for the island's name. The emigration of the Sicels to Sicily is said to have taken place in either 1264 BC or 1035 BC (Thucydides).

The remaining Siculians joined with the Aborigines eventually becoming the people known as Prisci Latini (meaning old Latins), that is Prisci et Latini, or simply Latini. The Aborigines did not become Latini until the reign of their king, Latinus, from whom the Romans attributed their name. This was after the arrival of the Trojans with Aeneas in the aftermath of the Trojan War.

Cities
The following list is based on Dionysius of Halicarnassus.
 Palatium: 25 stades from Reate.
 Tribula: 60 stades from Reate.
 Suesbula: 60 stades from Tribula, near the Ceraunian Mountains.
 Suna: 40 stades from Suesbula, with an ancient temple of Mars.
 Mefula: about 30 stades from Suna (ruins with walls in Roman times).
 Orvinium: 40 stades from Mefula. Apparently was once a large and famous city in its area with an ancient temple of Minerva.
 Corsula: about 80 stades from Reate, following the Curian Way, a road thought to go through Reate.
 Issa: an island surrounded by a lake, where the Aborigines relied on the marshy waters of the lake for defence.
 Maruvium: Situated near Issa, on an arm of the same lake and distant forty stades from something called the Septem Aquae.
 Batia: 30 stades from Reate.
 Tiora (or Matiene): at a distance of 300 stades from Reate.
 Lista: 24 stades from Tiora, claimed to be the mother-city of the Aborigines, which the Sabines had captured by a surprise attack.
 Cutilia: 70 stades from Reate.
All of these cities are claimed to have been taken from the Umbrians. In Latium itself the Aborigines had the cities Antemnae, Caenina, Ficulnea, Tellenae, and Tibur some of which Dionysius attests were taken from the Siculians.

See also
Ausones
Albani people

Notes

References

Further reading
 “Ante-Roman Races of Italy”, The Southern Quarterly Review, Vol.VII,  no.xiv, 1845, pp.261-299.
 Michiel Arnoud Cor de Vaan, Etymological Dictionary of Latin and the Other Italic Languages, Leiden, Brill, 2008: Aborigines. 
 Dionysius of Halicarnassus (trans. 1937) Roman Antiquities vol. I Harvard University Press (Translated by Earnest Cary) 1937 thru 1950.

Legendary tribes in Greco-Roman historiography
Ancient peoples of Italy